John Conroy (27 November 1928 in Nagpur, British India – 9 November 1985) was a British field hockey player who played for Mid Surrey Hockey Club and competed in the 1952 Summer Olympics winning a Bronze medal and in the 1956 Summer Olympics.

References

External links
 

1928 births
1985 deaths
Sportspeople from Nagpur
Field hockey players from Maharashtra
British people in colonial India
British male field hockey players
Olympic field hockey players of Great Britain
Field hockey players at the 1952 Summer Olympics
Field hockey players at the 1956 Summer Olympics
Olympic bronze medallists for Great Britain
Olympic medalists in field hockey
Medalists at the 1952 Summer Olympics